The year 1992 is the 4th year in the history of Shooto, a mixed martial arts promotion based in the Japan. In 1992 Shooto held 5 events beginning with, Shooto: Shooto.

Title fights

Events list

Shooto: Shooto

Shooto: Shooto was an event held on March 27, 1992, at Korakuen Hall in Tokyo, Japan.

Results

Shooto: Shooto

Shooto: Shooto was an event held on May 29, 1992, at Korakuen Hall in Tokyo, Japan.

Results

Shooto: Shooto

Shooto: Shooto was an event held on July 23, 1992, at Korakuen Hall in Tokyo, Japan.

Results

Shooto: Shooto

Shooto: Shooto was an event held on September 25, 1992, at Korakuen Hall in Tokyo, Japan.

Results

Shooto: Shooto

Shooto: Shooto was an event held on November 27, 1992, at Korakuen Hall in Tokyo, Japan.

Results

See also 
 Shooto
 List of Shooto champions
 List of Shooto Events

References

Shooto events
1992 in mixed martial arts